Morris "Mo" Finley (born August 2, 1981) is an American professional basketball player who last played for Élan Béarnais Pau-Orthez of the LNB Pro A. Standing at , he plays the point guard position. In 2023 he began a small modeling career by appearing in an Instagram post for Milo's Tea Company.

College career
Finley played college basketball at the University of Alabama Birmingham with the school's UAB Blazers. He is mostly remembered for hitting the game winning shot against the No. 1 overall seed Kentucky in the Second Round of the 2004 NCAA Tournament.

Pro career
Finley joined the Serbia and Montenegro League team Mornar Bar in 2004. He led the league in scoring during the 2004–05 season, averaging 23.3 points per game. In 2005, he joined the Greek League club Olympia Larissa for only 3 games. He then joined the Belgian team Liège Basket. In 2007, he joined the Italian League team Solsonica Rieti, and was the Serie A top scorer with 20.3 points per game. In 2008, he moved to Montepaschi Siena, where he won the Italian Championship. In 2009, he moved to Olimpia Milano. He started the season with Armani Jeans with a stunning performance, scoring 28 points on 10/16 shooting in a 66–73 loss against Milano's rival, Pallacanestro Varese. He led Olimpia both in Euroleague and in Serie A, until he suffered a strain on January 11, 2010. He missed three months of the season, but returned to help lead Olimpia back to the Finals. During the 2011 season Finley suffered a knee injury requiring surgery. He was sidelined for most of 2012, but returned to finish the season for Fenerbahçe Ülker in Turkey. In January 2013, he signed for Lagun Aro GBC of the Spanish League. After a sabbatical leave, he signed for Élan Béarnais Pau-Orthez of the French League in May 2014.

Career statistics

Euroleague statistics

|-
| align="left" | 2008–09
| align="left" | Montepaschi Siena
| 14 ||1|| 10.4 ||.396||.333|| 1.000 || .6 || 1.0 ||.9|| .0 ||4.5 || 4.5
|-
| align="left" | 2009–10
| align="left" | Armani Jeans Milano
| 9 ||9 || 33.0 || .392 || .308 ||.857|| 3.6 || 2.2 || 1.7 ||.0|| 12.4 || 10.9
|-
| align="left" | 2010–11
| align="left" | Armani Jeans Milano
| 10 ||9 || 29.5 || .519 || .433 ||.850|| 1.7 || 3.3 ||1.2|| .0 ||11.0 || 11.3
|-
| align="left" | Career
| align="left" | 
| 33 || 19 || 22.4 || .442 || .354 || .883 || 1.8 || 2.0 || 1.2 || .0 || 8.6 || 8.3

Italian League statistics

|-
| align="left" | 2007–08
| align="left" | Solsonica Rieti
| 30 || 28 || 30.8 || .498 || .423 || .846 || 3.3 || 3.3 || 2.5 || .1 || 20.3
|-
| align="left" | 2008–09
| align="left" | Montepaschi Siena
| 31 || 3 || 16.1 || .468 || .386 || .769 || 1.5 || 2.0 || 1.1 || .0 || 8.5
|-
| align="left" | 2009–10
| align="left" | Armani Jeans Milano
| 13 || 13 || 32.1 || .450 || .340 || .884 || 4.4 || 4.1 || 2.0 || .2 || 14.0
|-
| align="left" | Career
| align="left" | 
| 76 || 44 || 24.9 || .482 || .399 || .837 || 2.7 || 2.9 || 1.8 || .1 || 14.2

References

External links
 Euroleague.net profile
 FIBA.com profile
 UAB profile

1981 births
Living people
African-American basketball players
American expatriate basketball people in France
American expatriate basketball people in Greece
American expatriate basketball people in Italy
American expatriate basketball people in Montenegro
American expatriate basketball people in Spain
American expatriate basketball people in Turkey
American men's basketball players
Basketball players from Alabama
Élan Béarnais players
Fenerbahçe men's basketball players
Gipuzkoa Basket players
KK Mornar Bar players
Liège Basket players
Liga ACB players
Mens Sana Basket players
Olimpia Milano players
Olympia Larissa B.C. players
People from Opelika, Alabama
Point guards
UAB Blazers men's basketball players
21st-century African-American sportspeople
20th-century African-American people